Manuel Pérez "Manny" Batista (born May 5, 1969) is a Dominican American actor who has appeared in the television series Third Watch and in the film Washington Heights. He is the cousin of Pulitzer Prize-winning author Junot Diaz.

Life and career 
Pérez was born in Baitoa, Santiago, Dominican Republic and currently lives in Washington Heights, Manhattan.

Pérez is one of 11 siblings. By the time Pérez finished high school he knew that he wanted to be an actor so he moved to New York City where he majored in drama at Marymount Manhattan College, graduating in 1992.

He studied at Ensemble Studio Theatre and is a member of the LAByrinth Theatre Company, in New York City.

Following his performance on the film Washington Heights (which he also co-wrote and produced), Pérez garnered praise from many critics.

The New York Times stated "Mr. Perez has charisma to burn." He won the 2002 Best Actor Award at The Milan International Film Festival in Italy for his performance in Washington Heights.

At the Santo Domingo Invita show he was honored as one of the most prominent Dominican actors in the United States.

In November 2007 Pérez was honored in the Dominican Film Festival held in Puerto Plata along with Dania Ramirez for his humanitarian work in the Dominican Republic. When Pérez received the award he said that his first pair of shoes were given to him at the age of 5 by his father and that he only wore them to go to Mass on Sundays. Pérez also said that when he first got to the United States he was really fat and that he didn't know why since he was poor and didn't eat well until his mother took him to the doctor where they found out that his stomach was full of hookworms that got into his body through his feet since he would always walk barefoot. Pérez donated 10,000 shoes to families who lost everything after Hurricane Noel swept across the Dominican Republic.

In 2012 he was elected by Luz García's Noche de Luz programme as a "Summer's Hot Body".

Filmography
Films and television series that Pérez has appeared in include:

See also
 List of people from the Dominican Republic

References

External links
 

1969 births
Living people
Dominican Republic emigrants to the United States
Hispanic and Latino American male actors
Actors from Providence, Rhode Island
People from Washington Heights, Manhattan
Dominican Republic male actors
20th-century American male actors
21st-century American male actors
Male actors from Rhode Island
American male film actors
American male television actors